The Benelli Sei is a series of motorcycles that were produced by Italian manufacturer Benelli, and masterminded by automotive designer Alejandro de Tomaso, from 1973 to 1989. Two models were made, with 750 and 900 cc displacement. The 750 was the first production motorcycle with a six-cylinder engine.

Benelli 750 Sei
The Benelli 750 Sei was the first production motorcycle with a 6-cylinder engine and had two model releases. De Tomaso intended it to become Italy's premier sporting motorcycle and wanted it badged as a Moto Guzzi. On its launch, it received tremendous publicity overshadowing all other Italian bikes of that year. It started the trend of angular designed motorcycles moving away from traditional round forms.

The engine was based on the four-cylinder Honda CB500, but with two extra cylinders. The cylinder head fins of the Sei were squared off to provide a cosmetic individuality, but otherwise the engine is in most respects obviously derived from the Honda. The "angular, bold design" was by Carrozzeria Ghia.

Despite the extra cylinders, the Sei's width was kept to a minimum by siting the alternator (which, on the Honda, is at the left-hand end of the crankshaft) behind the cylinders. Cooling was improved by having air passages between the cylinders; the Sei had three Dell'Orto VHB 24 mm carburetors (the Honda CB 500 had four, for four cylinders). The vehicle  appeared to reviewers as heavy and cumbersome but handled surprisingly well, and had a unique signature exhaust note from its six mufflers.

 Production Frame numbers started at 5000.
 Production figures were as follows ; 
                                           Series 1  .  1974   293     #5001-5293
                                                        1975 1,479    from # 5294 
                                           Series 1 ,2  1976    87    from # 6774
                                           Series 2     1977   283    from # 6861
                                                        1978 1,058    from # 7145      

Sei 900
Series 1      1978     23   # 100001- 100023
Series 1      1979    515   # 100024- and up
Series 1/2    1980    322   # 100539- and up
Series 2      1981    312   # 100861- and up
Series 2/3    1982    176   # 101174- and up
Series 3      1983     26   # 101351- and up
Series 3      1984    106   # 101377- and up
Series 3      1985     25   # 101484- and up
Series 4      1986    200   # 101510- and up
Series 4      1987     88   # 101710- and up
Series 4      1988      0   # 101798- and up
Series 4      1989     85   # 101799- and up
Total production     1878

The Benelli 750 Six / 900 Six remained the only six-cylinder motorcycle in production until the entrance of the Honda CBX in 1978.

Benelli 900 Sei

In 1979, by which time Benellli had sold 3,200 vehicles, Benelli developed the 750 Sei into a 900 cc motorcycle by increasing bore and stroke, with six-into-two exhausts and a small bikini fairing used on the Moto Guzzi Le Mans. Less than 2,000 were made over four model releases. Described at the time as "outrageous"  or a "flashbike".  Flashbikes tended to be "rare, expensive, European, quirky, handsome and high performance". It had an original MSRP of $3,995. 
It was later released as a "Sei Sport" model with a larger bikini fairing.

See also 
List of Benelli motorcycles

References

External links
 Motorcycle Classics article on Benelli 750 Sei

750 Sei
Six-cylinder motorcycles
Motorcycles introduced in 1972
Standard motorcycles
Sport touring motorcycles